Graham v Minister for Immigration and Border Protection was a case heard by the High Court of Australia at the same time as Te Puia v Minister for Immigration and Border Protection, which held that section 503A of the Migration Act 1958 is invalid to the extent that s 503A(2)(c) would apply to prevent the Minister for Immigration and Border Protection from being required to divulge or communicate certain information to the High Court or Federal Court.

Background 

The plaintiff in Graham was Aaron Graham; the applicant in Te Puia was Mehaka Te Puia. Both are citizens of New Zealand and had Class TY Subclass 444 Special Category (Temporary) visas. Both received letters—Graham on 9 June 2016 and Te Puia on 2 November 2015—that the Minister for Immigration and Border Protection had decided to cancel their visas. The reasons given by the Minister for the cancellation of the visas were, for Graham's visa, that "he was satisfied as to the conditions for cancellation provided in s 501(3) of the Migration Act 1958 and that he should not exercise his discretion in favour of the plaintiff to not cancel his visa," and in the case of Te Puia, undisclosed reasons citing section 503A of the Migration Act that rendered such reasons protected from disclosure.

Section 503A(2) of the Migration Act states that:

Decision 

The High Court handed down its decision on 6 September 2017, with its reasons published the same day. The Court, by a majority, held that:

References

External links 

 Case M97/2016 : Graham v. Minister for Immigration and Border Protection

High Court of Australia cases
2016 in Australian law
2017 in Australian law